Helles or hell is a traditional German pale lager beer, produced chiefly in Southern Germany, particularly Munich. The German word hell can be translated as "bright", "light", or "pale".

Flavour profile
Helles-style beers typically are full-bodied, mildly sweet and light-coloured, with low bitterness. The beer is clear due to filtration prior to bottling, although some restaurants and breweries do offer an unfiltered version. Munich-style helles is a yellow beer brewed using cool fermentation with a lager yeast such as Saccharomyces pastorianus, bitter hops such as Hallertau hops, and an original specific gravity (prior to fermentation) between 1.044 and 1.053 (11 to 13 degrees plato), and between 4.5 and 6% alcohol by volume. Helles has a less pronounced hop flavour than pilsner beers.

History
Until the 1960s, Helles was universally available in German-speaking regions. In many regions, Helles was slowly replaced by pilsner-style beers, which was also driven by changing consumer preferences from draft beer to bottled beer. In regions outside of Southern Germany, Helles is regaining popularity, particularly Berlin, where the beer's traditional image has become trendy.

Distribution
Helles enjoys great popularity in the Southern German regions of Bavaria, Franconia, and Baden-Württemberg. No clear distinction is drawn between lager and export, although export typically is closer in style to Dortmunder Export, which has a slightly higher ABV of 5.5% for extended shelf life.

Examples
 Andechser Hell
 Augustiner-Bräu Lagerbier Hell
 Ayinger Lager Hell
 Bayreuther Hell
 Chiemseer Hell
 Dinkelacker Hell
 Erdinger Brauhaus Helles
 Flötzinger Hell
 Giesinger Münchner Hell
 Hacker-Pschorr Münchner Helles
 Hofbräu München Original
 Kichesippi Beer Co. Heller Highwater
 Löwenbräu Original
 Oberdorfer Helles
 Nashville Brewing Company's Nashville Original Lager
 Paulaner Münchner Hell
 Spaten Münchner Hell
 Schönramer Hell
 Stiegl Hell
 Tegernseer Hell
 Weihenstephaner Original
 Ølsnedkeren Sikkert og vist
 Penn Brewery Gold
 Tonewood Brewing Lumberyard

See also
 Beer in Germany

References

German beer styles
German cuisine
Pages translated from German Wikipedia